A Tour Card is needed to compete in Professional Darts Corporation ProTour tournaments.

In total 128 players are granted Tour Cards, which enables them to participate in all Players Championships and European Tour Qualifiers.

Most Tour Cards are valid for 2 years. The top 64 in the PDC Order of Merit all received Tour Cards automatically, and those who won a two-year card in 2018 still had a valid card for 2019. The top 2 of the 2018 Challenge Tour and Development Tour also won cards. 30 remaining places will be played out at the 2019 Q-Schools, with the four days of competition giving two Cards a day from the UK Q-School and one a day from the European Q-School; with the remaining players being ranked and the top players also receiving Cards. All players who will win a card at either Q-School have their Order of Merit ranking reset to zero.

Players

Tour Cards per Nations

See also
List of darts players
List of darts players who have switched organisation

References 

2019 PDC Pro Tour
2019 in darts
Lists of darts players